John Davison Rockefeller Jr. (January 29, 1874 – May 11, 1960) was an American financier and philanthropist, and the only son of Standard Oil co-founder John D. Rockefeller.

He was involved in the development of the vast office complex in Midtown Manhattan known as Rockefeller Center, making him one of the largest real estate holders in the city. Towards the end of his life, he was famous for his philanthropy, donating over $500 million to a wide variety of different causes, including educational establishments. Among his projects was the reconstruction of Colonial Williamsburg in Virginia. He was widely blamed for having orchestrated the Ludlow Massacre and other offenses during the Colorado Coalfield War.
 
Rockefeller was the father of six children: Abby, John III, Nelson, Laurance, Winthrop, and David.

Early life
Rockefeller was the fifth and last child of Standard Oil co-founder John Davison Rockefeller Sr. and schoolteacher Laura Celestia "Cettie" Spelman. His four older sisters were Elizabeth (Bessie), Alice (who died an infant), Alta, and Edith. Living in his father's mansion at 4 West 54th Street, he attended Park Avenue Baptist Church at 64th Street (now Central Presbyterian Church) and the Browning School, a tutorial establishment set up for him and other children of associates of the family; it was located in a brownstone owned by the Rockefellers, on West 55th Street. His father John Sr. and uncle William A. Rockefeller Jr. co-founded Standard Oil together.

Initially, he had intended to go to Yale University but was encouraged by William Rainey Harper, president of the University of Chicago, among others, to enter the Baptist-oriented Brown University instead. Nicknamed "Johnny Rock" by his roommates, he joined both the Glee and the Mandolin clubs, taught a Bible class, and was elected junior class president. Scrupulously careful with money, he stood out as different from other rich men's sons.

In 1897, he graduated with the degree of Bachelor of Arts, after taking nearly a dozen courses in the social sciences, including a study of Karl Marx's Das Kapital. He joined the Alpha Delta Phi fraternity and was elected to Phi Beta Kappa.

Business career

After graduation from Brown, Rockefeller joined his father's business in October 1897, setting up operations in the newly formed family office at 26 Broadway where he became a director of Standard Oil. He later also became a director at J. P. Morgan's U.S. Steel company, which had been formed in 1901.  Junior resigned from both companies in 1910 in an attempt to "purify" his ongoing philanthropy from commercial and financial interests after the Hearst media empire unearthed a bribery scandal involving John Dustin Archbold (the successor to Senior as head of Standard Oil) and two prominent members of Congress.

In September 1913, the United Mine Workers of America declared a strike against the Colorado Fuel and Iron (CF&I) company in what would become the Colorado Coalfield War. Junior owned a controlling interest in CF&I (40% of its stock) and sat on the board as an absentee director. In April 1914, after a long period of industrial unrest, the Ludlow Massacre occurred at a tent camp occupied by striking miners. At least 20 men, women, and children died in the slaughter. This was followed by nine days of violence between miners and the Colorado National Guard.  Although he did not order the attack that began this unrest, there are accounts to suggest Junior was mostly to blame for the violence, with the awful working conditions, death ratio, and no paid dead work which included securing unstable ceilings, workers were forced into working in unsafe conditions just to make ends meet.  In January 1915, Junior was called to testify before the Commission on Industrial Relations.  Many critics blamed Rockefeller for ordering the massacre. Margaret Sanger wrote an attack piece in her magazine The Woman Rebel, declaring, "But remember Ludlow! Remember the men and women and children who were sacrificed in order that John D. Rockefeller Jr., might continue his noble career of charity and philanthropy as a supporter of the Christian faith."

He was at the time being advised by William Lyon Mackenzie King and the pioneer public relations expert, Ivy Lee.  Lee warned that the Rockefellers were losing public support and developed a strategy that Junior followed to repair it. It was necessary for Junior to overcome his shyness, go personally to Colorado to meet with the miners and their families, inspect the conditions of the homes and the factories, attend social events, and especially to listen closely to the grievances. This was novel advice and attracted widespread media attention, which opened the way to resolve the conflict, and present a more humanized version of the Rockefellers.  Mackenzie King said Rockefeller's testimony was the turning point in Junior's life, restoring the reputation of the family name; it also heralded a new era of industrial relations in the country.

During the Great Depression, he was involved in the financing, development, and construction of the Rockefeller Center, a vast office complex in midtown Manhattan, and as a result, became one of the largest real estate holders in New York City. He was influential in attracting leading blue-chip corporations as tenants in the complex, including GE and its then affiliates RCA, NBC and RKO, as well as Standard Oil of New Jersey (now ExxonMobil), Associated Press, Time Inc, and branches of Chase National Bank (now JP Morgan Chase).

The family office, of which he was in charge, shifted from 26 Broadway to the 56th floor of the landmark 30 Rockefeller Plaza upon its completion in 1933.  The office formally became "Rockefeller Family and Associates" (and informally, "Room 5600").

In 1921, Junior received about 10% of the shares of the Equitable Trust Company from his father, making him the bank's largest shareholder. Subsequently, in 1930, Equitable merged with Chase National Bank, making Chase the largest bank in the world at the time. Although his stockholding was reduced to about 4% following this merger, he was still the largest shareholder in what became known as "the Rockefeller bank". As late as the 1960s, the family still retained about 1% of the bank's shares, by which time his son David had become the bank's president.

In the late 1920s, Rockefeller founded the Dunbar National Bank in Harlem. The financial institution was located within the Paul Laurence Dunbar Apartments at 2824 Eighth Avenue near 150th Street, servicing a primarily African-American clientele. It was unique among New York City financial institutions in that it employed African Americans as tellers, clerks and bookkeepers as well as in key management positions. However, the bank folded after only a few years of operation.

Philanthropy and social causes
In a celebrated letter to Nicholas Murray Butler in June 1932, subsequently printed on the front page of The New York Times, Rockefeller, a lifelong teetotaler, argued against the continuation of the Eighteenth Amendment on the principal grounds of an increase in disrespect for the law. This letter became an important event in pushing the nation to repeal Prohibition.

Rockefeller was known for his philanthropy, giving over $537 million to myriad causes over his lifetime compared to $240 million to his own family. He created the Sealantic Fund in 1938 to channel gifts to his favorite causes; previously his main philanthropic organization had been the Davison Fund. He had become the Rockefeller Foundation's inaugural president in May 1913 and proceeded to dramatically expand the scope of this institution, founded by his father. Later he would become involved in other organizations set up by Senior: Rockefeller University and the International Education Board.

In the social sciences, he founded the Laura Spelman Rockefeller Memorial in 1918, which was subsequently folded into the Rockefeller Foundation in 1929. A committed internationalist, he financially supported programs of the League of Nations and crucially funded the formation and ongoing expenses of the Council on Foreign Relations and its initial headquarters building in New York in 1921.

He established the Bureau of Social Hygiene in 1913, a major initiative that investigated such social issues as prostitution and venereal disease, as well as studies in police administration and support for birth control clinics and research. In 1924, at the instigation of his wife, he provided crucial funding for Margaret Sanger–who had previously been a personal opponent to him due to his treatment of workers–in her work on birth control and involvement in population issues. He donated $5000 to her American Birth Control League in 1924 and a second time in 1925.

In the arts, he gave extensive property he owned on West 54th Street in Manhattan for the site of the Museum of Modern Art, which had been co-founded by his wife in 1929.

In 1925, he purchased the George Grey Barnard collection of medieval art and cloister fragments for the Metropolitan Museum of Art. He also purchased land north of the original site, now Fort Tryon Park, for a new building, The Cloisters.

In November 1926, Rockefeller came to the College of William and Mary for the dedication of an auditorium built-in memory of the organizers of Phi Beta Kappa, the honorary scholastic fraternity founded in Williamsburg in 1776. Rockefeller was a member of the society and had helped pay for the auditorium. He had visited Williamsburg the previous March, when the Reverend Dr. W. A. R. Goodwin escorted him—along with his wife Abby, and their sons, David, Laurance, and Winthrop—on a quick tour of the city. The upshot of his visit was that he approved the plans already developed by Goodwin and launched the massive historical restoration of Colonial Williamsburg on November 22, 1927. Amongst many other buildings restored through his largesse was The College of William & Mary's Wren Building and the Episcopalian Bruton Parish Church.

In 1940, Rockefeller hosted Bill Wilson, one of the original founders of Alcoholics Anonymous, and others at a dinner to tell their stories. "News of this got out on the world wires; inquiries poured in again and many people went to the bookstores to get the book, Alcoholics Anonymous." Rockefeller offered to pay for the publication of the book, but in keeping with AA traditions of being self-supporting, AA rejected the money.

Through negotiations by his son Nelson, in 1946 he bought for $8.5 million—from the major New York real estate developer William Zeckendorf—the land along the East River in Manhattan which he later donated for the United Nations headquarters. This was after he had vetoed the family estate at Pocantico as a prospective site for the headquarters (see Kykuit). Another UN connection was his early financial support for its predecessor, the League of Nations; this included a gift to endow a major library for the League in Geneva which today still remains a resource for the UN.

A confirmed ecumenicist, over the years he gave substantial sums to Protestant and Baptist institutions, ranging from the Interchurch World Movement, the Federal Council of Churches, the Union Theological Seminary, the Cathedral of St. John the Divine, New York's Riverside Church, and the World Council of Churches. He was also instrumental in the development of the research that led to Robert and Helen Lynd's famous Middletown studies work that was conducted in the city of Muncie, Indiana, that arose out of the financially supported Institute of Social and Religious Research.

As a follow on to his involvement in the Ludlow Massacre, Rockefeller was a major initiator with his close friend and advisor William Lyon Mackenzie King in the nascent industrial relations movement; along with major chief executives of the time, he incorporated Industrial Relations Counselors (IRC) in 1926, a consulting firm whose main goal was to establish industrial relations as a recognized academic discipline at Princeton University and other institutions. It succeeded through the support of prominent corporate chieftains of the time, such as Owen D. Young and Gerard Swope of General Electric.

Overseas philanthropy
In the 1920s, he also donated a substantial amount towards the restoration and rehabilitation of major buildings in France after World War I, such as the Reims Cathedral, the Château de Fontainebleau and the Château de Versailles, for which in 1936 he was awarded France's highest decoration, the Grand-Croix de la Legion d'honneur, which also was awarded decades later to his son David Rockefeller.

He also liberally funded the notable early excavations at Luxor in Egypt, and the American School of Classical Studies for excavation of the Agora and the reconstruction of the Stoa of Attalos, both in Athens; the American Academy in Rome; Lingnan University in China; St. Luke's International Hospital in Tokyo; the library of the Imperial University in Tokyo; and the Shakespeare Memorial Endowment at Stratford-on-Avon.

In addition, he provided the funding for the construction of the Palestine Archaeological Museum in East Jerusalem – the Rockefeller Museum – which today houses many antiquities and was the home of many of the Dead Sea Scrolls until they were moved to the Shrine of the Book at the Israel Museum.

Conservation

He had a special interest in conservation, and purchased and donated land for many American National Parks, including Grand Teton (hiding his involvement and intentions behind the Snake River Land Company), Mesa Verde National Park, Acadia, Great Smoky Mountains, Yosemite, and Shenandoah. In the case of Acadia National Park, he financed and engineered an extensive Carriage Road network throughout the park.  Both the John D. Rockefeller Jr. Memorial Parkway that connects Yellowstone National Park to the Grand Teton National Park and the Rockefeller Memorial in the Great Smoky Mountains National Park were named after him. He was also active in the movement to save redwood trees, making a significant contribution to Save the Redwoods League in the 1920s to enable the purchase of what would become the Rockefeller Forest in Humboldt Redwoods State Park.

In 1951, he established Sleepy Hollow Restorations, which brought together under one administrative body the management and operation of two historic sites he had acquired: Philipsburg Manor House in North Tarrytown, now called Sleepy Hollow (acquired in 1940 and donated to the Tarrytown Historical Society), and Sunnyside, Washington Irving's home, acquired in 1945. He bought Van Cortland Manor in Croton-on-Hudson in 1953 and in 1959 donated it to Sleepy Hollow Restorations. In all, he invested more than $12 million in the acquisition and restoration of the three properties that were the core of the organization's holdings. In 1986, Sleepy Hollow Restorations became Historic Hudson Valley, which also operates the current guided tours of the Rockefeller family estate of Kykuit in Pocantico Hills.

He is the author of the noted life principle, among others, inscribed on a tablet facing his famed Rockefeller Center: "I believe that every right implies a responsibility; every opportunity, an obligation; every possession, a duty".

In 1935, Rockefeller received The Hundred Year Association of New York's Gold Medal Award, "in recognition of outstanding contributions to the City of New York." He was awarded the Public Welfare Medal from the National Academy of Sciences in 1943.

Family
In August 1900, Rockefeller was invited by the powerful senator Nelson Wilmarth Aldrich of Rhode Island to join a party aboard President William McKinley's yacht, the USS Dolphin, on a cruise to Cuba. Although the outing was of a political nature, Rockefeller's future wife, philanthropist/socialite Abigail Greene "Abby" Aldrich, was included in the large party; the two had first met in the fall of 1894 and had been courting for over four years.

Rockefeller married Abby on October 9, 1901, in what was seen at the time as the consummate marriage of capitalism and politics. She was a daughter of Senator Aldrich and Abigail Pearce Truman "Abby" Chapman. Moreover, their wedding was the major social event of its time - one of the most lavish of the Gilded Age. It was held at the Aldrich Mansion at Warwick Neck, Rhode Island, and attended by executives of Standard Oil and other companies.

The couple had six children; Abby in 1903, John III in 1906, Nelson in 1908, Laurance in 1910, Winthrop in 1912, and David in 1915.

Abby died of a heart attack at the family apartment at 740 Park Avenue in April 1948. Junior remarried in 1951, to Martha Baird, the widow of his old college classmate Arthur Allen. Rockefeller died of pneumonia on May 11, 1960, at the age of 86 in Tucson, Arizona, and was interred in the family cemetery in Tarrytown, with 40 family members present.

His sons, the five Rockefeller brothers, established an extensive network of social connections and institutional power over time, based on the foundations that Junior - and before him Senior - had laid down. David became a prominent banker, philanthropist and world statesman. Abby and John III became philanthropists. Laurance became a venture capitalist and conservationist. Nelson and Winthrop Rockefeller later became state governors; Nelson went on to serve as Vice President of the United States under President Gerald Ford.

Residences
From 1901  to 1913, Junior lived at 13 West 54th Street in New York. Afterward, Junior's principal residence in New York was the 9-story mansion at 10 West 54th Street, but he owned a group of properties in this vicinity, including Nos. 4, 12, 14 and 16 (some of these properties had been previously acquired by his father, John D. Rockefeller). After he vacated No. 10 in 1936, these properties were razed and subsequently all the land was gifted to his wife's Museum of Modern Art. In that year he moved into a luxurious 40-room triplex apartment at 740 Park Avenue. In 1953, the real estate developer William Zeckendorf bought the 740 Park Avenue apartment complex and then sold it to Rockefeller, who quickly turned the building into a cooperative, selling it on to his rich neighbors in the building.

Years later, just after his son Nelson become Governor of New York, Rockefeller helped foil a bid by greenmailer Saul Steinberg to take over Chemical Bank. Steinberg bought Junior's apartment for $225,000, $25,000 less than it had cost new in 1929.  It has since been called the greatest trophy apartment in New York, in the world's richest apartment building.

Honors and legacy
In 1929, Junior was elected an honorary member of the Georgia Society of the Cincinnati. In 1935, he received The Hundred Year Association of New York's Gold Medal Award "in recognition of outstanding contributions to the City of New York." In 1939, he was elected Fellow of the Royal Society under statute 12.

The John D. Rockefeller Jr. Library at Brown University, completed in 1964, is named in his honor.

See also
 Forest Hill, Ohio
 John D. Rockefeller Jr. Library
 John D. Rockefeller Jr. Memorial Parkway
 Rockefeller Brothers Fund
 Rockefeller family
 Rockefeller Foundation

Citations

Further reading
 Chernow, Ron. Titan: The Life of John D. Rockefeller, Sr. New York: Warner Books, 1998., Detailed biography of his father
 Fosdick, Raymond B. John D. Rockefeller, Jr.: A Portrait (1956), full biography. online
 Greenspan, Anders. "How philanthropy can alter our view of the past: a look at Colonial Williamsburg". Voluntas: International Journal of Voluntary and Nonprofit Organizations 5.2 (1994): 193–203.
 Hallahan, Kirk. "Ivy Lee and the Rockefellers' response to the 1913-1914 Colorado coal strike". Journal of Public Relations Research 14#4 (2002): 265–315.
 Harr, John Ensor, and Peter J. Johnson. The Rockefeller Century (1988)
 Harvey, Charles E. "John D. Rockefeller, Jr., and the Interchurch World Movement of 1919–1920: A Different Angle on the Ecumenical Movement". Church History 51#2 (1982): 198–209.
 Harvey, Charles E. "John D. Rockefeller, Jr., and the social sciences: An introduction". Journal of the History of Sociology 4#2 (1982): 1-31.
 Henry, Robin. "'In our image, according to our likeness': John D. Rockefeller, jr. and reconstructing manhood in post-Ludlow Colorado". Journal of the Gilded Age and Progressive Era 16.1 (2017): 24.
 Loebl, Suzanne. America's Medicis: The Rockefellers and Their Astonishing Cultural Legacy (Harper Collins, 2010).
 Manchester, William. A Rockefeller Family Portrait: From John D. to Nelson (1959)
 Moore, Jay D. Alcoholics Anonymous and the Rockefeller Connection: How John D. Rockefeller Jr. and his Associates Saved AA (2015).
 Patmore, Greg. "Employee representation plans at the Minnequa steelworks, Pueblo, Colorado, 1915–1942". Business History 49.6 (2007): 844–867.
 Rausch, Helke. "The Birth of Transnational US Philanthropy from the Spirit of War: Rockefeller Philanthropists in World War I". Journal of the Gilded Age and Progressive Era 17.4 (2018): 650–662.
 Rees, Jonathan H. Representation and Rebellion: The Rockefeller Plan at the Colorado Fuel and Iron Company, 1914–1942 (2011)
 Schenkel, Albert F. The rich man and the kingdom: John D. Rockefeller Jr., and the Protestant establishment (Augsburg Fortress Pub, 1995)
 Scott, Nicholas R. "John D. Rockefeller, Jr. & Eugenics: A Means of Social Manipulation". Journal of American History 61 (1974): 225–26.
 Tevis, Martha May. "Philanthropy at its best: The General Education Board’s contributions to education, 1902–1964". Journal of Philosophy & History of Education 64.1 (2014): 63–72.

Primary sources
 Ernst, Joseph W., and John Davison Rockefeller. Dear Father/dear Son: Correspondence of John D. Rockefeller and John D. Rockefeller Jr. (Fordham Univ Press, 1994)
 Ernst, Joseph W., John Davison Rockefeller, and Horace Marden Albright. Worthwhile Places: Correspondence of John D. Rockefeller, Jr. and Horace M. Albright (Fordham Univ Press, 1991).

External links

 Rockefeller Archive Center: Extended Biography
 The Architect of Colonial Williamsburg: William Graves Perry, by Will Molineux An article from the Colonial Williamsburg Journal, 2004, outlining Rockefeller's involvement
 

1874 births
1960 deaths
Acadia National Park
American art collectors
American financiers
American officials of the United Nations
American people of English descent
American people of German descent
American people of Scotch-Irish descent
Baptists from New York (state)
Brown University alumni
Browning School alumni
Businesspeople from New York City
Fathers of vice presidents of the United States
Fellows of the Royal Society (Statute 12)
Grand Croix of the Légion d'honneur
Deaths from pneumonia in Arizona
Mount Desert Island
Philanthropists from New York (state)
Rockefeller Center
Rockefeller family
Rockefeller Foundation people